Ings are water meadows. 

Ings also may refer to:

 Ings, Cumbria, UK village

Surname
 Daniel Ings (born 1985), English actor
 Danny Ings (born 1992), English footballer
 Kendrick Ings (born 1990), American football player
 Simon Ings (born 1965), English writer

See also
 Ing (disambiguation)